Leonardo Ramos may refer to:

Leonardo Ramos (footballer, born 1969), Uruguayan footballer
Leonardo Ramos (footballer, born 1989), Argentine footballer
Leonardo Ramos dos Santos (born 1992), Brazilian footballer